"Dear Elaine" is a 1972 song written and produced by Roy Wood. It was first released on Wood's July 1973 debut solo album, Boulders, before being issued as a single on 11 August 1973. Wood played all of the musical instruments on the recording, as well as supplying lead and multi-tracked backing vocals. The song was globally published by Essex Music International, Inc. (ASCAP).

The track reached number 18 in the UK Singles Chart. The single remained in the UK chart for eight weeks.

"Dear Elaine" was a "semi-classical" experimental pop song reminiscent of Pink Floyd and Queen. It featured a slow tempo, with Wood singing with acoustic guitar, French horns and bass, alongside sporadic usage of Wood's multitracked choir.

In 1994, Wood stated, "Even though we didn't actually record it as the Move, I had already written "Dear Elaine", which I subsequently put on the Boulders solo album. I thought that was probably the best song I'd written at that time".

The track has appeared on numerous compilation albums, including Wood's own Singles (1993, Connoisseur Records). The track is still played on national radio, with BBC Radio airing it in January 2019.

Reception
Sounds magazine, in its July 1973 edition, described the song as "a charming, eccentric, gentle record from one of rock's real craftsmen. It may be too languid for popular success but it's a lovely record anyway. Ignore it at your peril".

References

External links
YouTube video

1972 songs
1973 singles
Baroque pop songs
Experimental pop songs
Songs written by Roy Wood
Song recordings produced by Roy Wood
Harvest Records singles